Full Speed Ahead is a 1936 British drama film directed by Lawrence Huntington and starring Paul Neville, Moira Lynd and Richard Norris. The film was made at Wembley Studios as a quota quickie for distribution by the Hollywood company Paramount Pictures. It is also known by the alternative title Full Steam Ahead.

Synopsis
A couple elope on a ship, only to discover that the dishonest captain plans to scuttle it for insurance purposes.

Cast
 Paul Neville as Captain Murton 
 Moira Lynd as Jean Hunter 
 Richard Norris as Tim Brent 
 George Mozart as Chief Smith 
 Geoffrey Clark as Dunn 
 Victor Hagen as Smith 
 George Turner as Oily Short 
 Arthur Seaton as Irving Hunter 
 Julian Vedey as Mendoza 
 Syd Crossley as Muggridge 
 Arthur Brander as Alec Goodhill  
 Dorothy Dewhurst as Mrs. Meddlecott
 Frederick Peisley as Michael Elwood

References

Bibliography
 Chibnall, Steve. Quota Quickies: The British of the British 'B' Film. British Film Institute, 2007.
 Low, Rachael. Filmmaking in 1930s Britain. George Allen & Unwin, 1985.
 Wood, Linda. British Films, 1927-1939. British Film Institute, 1986.

External links

1936 films
British drama films
British black-and-white films
1936 drama films
Films directed by Lawrence Huntington
Films shot at Wembley Studios
Films set in England
Seafaring films
1930s English-language films
1930s British films